Fortune Is a Woman is a 1957 black and white British-American film noir crime film directed by Sidney Gilliat and starring Jack Hawkins and Arlene Dahl. Its plot concerns an attempted insurance fraud that goes badly wrong. In the United States, it was released as She Played With Fire. The film is based on Winston Graham's novel Fortune Is a Woman (1953).

Plot
In a dream sequence, a ticking metronome transforms into the sweeping windscreen wiper of a sports car travelling at night in heavy rain. The car pulls up before a large Gothic mansion; the dreamer enters and walks to where a painting of the same house hangs above the mantelpiece; the camera zooms in on the door in the painting. The dreamer, Oliver Branwell, awakes with a start.

Branwell is an insurance investigator with a London firm of adjusters, Anderson & Son. Though it is Christmas Eve, he is sent north to Lowis Manor to probe a recent fire. Mr. Tracey Moreton lives there with his mother and wife Sarah. He introduces Branwell to them and to a neighbour, his cousin Clive. Branwell and the wife exchange glances but do not reveal that they had been lovers five years earlier in Hong Kong. Branwell reviews the fire damage and discovers, among several scorched paintings, one resembling the picture in the dream (an old and valuable distant view of the manor, by Bonnington) which is apparently irreparable.

The insurance company pays out on the damage and the painting. Months later, in a new case, Charles Highbury, known as "The Singing Miner," makes an insurance claim for loss of his voice. He has a black eye, given to him by his wife upon discovering him having an affair with a Mrs. Vere Litchen. Branwell visits Litchen, to see she possesses a painting resembling the apparently destroyed work. Later, he confirms that the manor house is indeed the one in the landscape and he enquires about its provenance. The investigation points to Sarah having sold the painting and making a false insurance claim.

Branwell educates himself on how to spot fake paintings and, believing the occupants to be away, breaks into the manor one night to inspect the authenticity of the paintings. Finding Moreton's dead body downstairs, where it had fallen from a first floor balcony, and, nearby, a distinctive smoking cigarette, he becomes aware a fire has been started in the cellar. He tries to extinguish it, but is unsuccessful. After calling the fire brigade, pretending to be Tracey Moreton, he escapes. The fire destroys the house and any remaining paintings (which Branwell now knows to be fakes). He invents an injury to pass handling of the case to his boss and keeps silent about what he knows for Sarah's sake. In due course, the insurance company settles a £30,000 claim on Sarah Moreton.

Time passes. Sarah visits Branwell, but he is convinced she is implicated. After a misunderstanding, a relieved Branwell realises Sarah is innocent of the arson and goes to show her photo to Mrs. Litchen's rich fiancé, Croft, who confirms Sarah is not the woman who sold him the painting. He apologises to Sarah and they agree to return the payout. He proposes, and they marry in haste before departing on a honeymoon to France.

In France, Sarah is horrified to receive a ring in the post that Tracey Moreton always wore and the couple immediately cut short their honeymoon. In London, she and Branwell are blackmailed for half the payout through an agent representing an individual who clearly knows of the insurance scam. The police are becoming suspicious and question Branwell.

The Branwells follow the agent to the premises of an Ambrosine, the forger of the paintings, and discover she was the painting's seller and is in league with Clive Fisher. Arriving, Fisher confesses to the blackmail but denies Moreton's murder and any connection to the ring. Back in their hotel room, the couple discover that Sarah's poodle has been kidnapped. Sarah later finds a cigarette butt left by the kidnapper that Branwell had hidden. Sarah recognises the brand and goes to Lowis Manor, pursued by Branwell, who finds Sarah with Tracey's mother, Mrs. Moreton. The old lady acknowledges she had suspected her son was intent on destroying the manor as an insurance fraud and had been in the house when her son died. They had argued and, in a fit of rage, Tracey had fallen from the balcony to his death. Mrs. Moreton had kidnapped the poodle and sent the ring to pressure the Branwells into staying silent and thereby preserving her dead son's reputation. The scene dissolves to a board meeting at the adjuster's offices where Mrs. Moreton is finishing her confession. Branwell resigns as a matter of honour, but on leaving is intercepted by board members keen to persuade him to stay in his post.

Cast
 Jack Hawkins as Oliver Branwell
 Arlene Dahl as Sarah Moreton
 Dennis Price as Tracey Moreton
 Violet Farebrother as Mrs. Moreton
 Ian Hunter as Clive Fisher
 Malcolm Keen as Old Abercrombie
 Geoffrey Keen as Young Abercrombie
 Patrick Holt as Fred Connor
 John Robinson as Berkeley Reckitt
 Michael Goodliffe as Sgt. Barnes
 Martin Lane as Det. Con. Watson
 Bernard Miles as Mr. Jerome
 Christopher Lee as Charles Highbury
 Greta Gynt as Vere Litchen
 John Phillips as Willis Croft
 Patricia Marmont as Ambrosine
 George A. Cooper as Hotel Porter (uncredited)
 Leslie Perrins as Chairman of Tribunal (uncredited)

See also
 List of British films of 1957
 List of American films of 1958

References

External links

1957 films
1957 crime films
British crime films
British black-and-white films
Films directed by Sidney Gilliat
Films scored by William Alwyn
Columbia Pictures films
Films based on British novels
Films set in London
Films shot at Shepperton Studios
1950s English-language films
1950s British films